Naib Subedar Jinson Johnson (born 15 March 1991) is an Indian middle-distance runner and an Indian Army Junior Commissioned Officer (JCO) who specialises in the 800 and 1500 metres event. He participated in the 800 metres event at the 2016 Summer Olympics. In 2018 Commonwealth Games he finished fifth setting a new national record in the 1500 metres race by breaking 23 year old record of Bahadur Prasad. Later in 2018, he went on to win the gold medal in the men's 1500m at the 2018 Asian Games in Jakarta, Indonesia with a timing of 3:44.72 in the final event, as well as a silver medal in 800 metres.

Early life
Johnson was born on 15 March 1991 in the town of Chakkittapara in Kozhikode district, Kerala. He did his schooling at the St. George's High School in Kulathuvayal and graduation at the Baselius College in Kottayam. He trained at the Kerala Sports Council's sports hostel in Kottayam, before joining the Indian Army in 2009. As of July 2015, he is posted as a junior commissioned officer at Hyderabad. As of 2018, he holds the rank of Naib Subedar.

Career
Johnson won the silver medal in the 800 meters event of the 2015 Asian Athletics Championships held in Wuhan with a time of 1:49.69. He also won three gold medals at the Asian Grand Prix in Thailand the same year.

Johnson qualified for the 800 meters event at the 2016 Summer Olympics by clocking his personal best time of 1:45.98 at Bangalore in July 2016, meeting the Olympics qualification standard of 1:46.00. Johnson broke the long standing national record of Sriram Singh in 800 meters in June 2018 when he clocked a time of 1:45.65 secs in Inter State Senior Athletics Championships .

At the 2018 Asian Games he won a gold medal in 1500m event and in 800 m he won the silver medal finishing behind compatriot Manjit Singh, who won the gold medal
.

References

External links
 

1991 births
Living people
People from Kozhikode district
Indian male sprinters
Athletes from Kerala
Athletes (track and field) at the 2016 Summer Olympics
Olympic athletes of India
Athletes (track and field) at the 2018 Commonwealth Games
Athletes (track and field) at the 2018 Asian Games
Indian Army officers
Asian Games medalists in athletics (track and field)
Asian Games gold medalists for India
Asian Games silver medalists for India
Medalists at the 2018 Asian Games
Asian Games gold medalists in athletics (track and field)
Recipients of the Arjuna Award
Commonwealth Games competitors for India